Messina Centrale railway station (Italian: Stazione di Messina Centrale or Messina Centrale) is the main railway station of the Italian city of Messina in Sicily. As Palermo Centrale, Catania Centrale and Syracuse it is one of the most important stations of its region. It is owned by the Ferrovie dello Stato, the national rail company of Italy.

History
The station, originally named simply as Messina, was inaugurated on 12 December 1866, as the terminal of the railway to Taormina, the first section of the Messina-Catania-Siracusa line. Heavily damaged after the 1908 earthquake, it was repaired a few years later. In 1939 it was finally renewed and replaced by the modern Messina Centrale, with the station building projected by the architect Angiolo Mazzoni.

Train services
The station is served by the following service(s):

Intercity services Rome - Naples - Messina - Palermo
Intercity services Rome - Naples - Messina - Catania - Siracusa
Night train service (Intercity Night) Rome - Naples - Messina - Palermo
Night train service (Intercity Night) Rome - Naples - Messina - Catania - Siracusa
Night train service (  Intercity Night ) Milan - Genoa - Salerno - Messina - Palermo
Night train service (  Intercity Night ) Milan - Genoa - Salerno - Messina - Catania - Siracusa
Regional services (Treno regionale) Messina - Palermo
Regional services (Treno regionale) Messina - Giarre-Riposto - Catania - Siracusa
Local services (Treno regionale) Messina - Patti
Local services (Treno regionale) Messina - Giampilieri

Structure and transport
The new station building was projected following the modern criteria of the futurist architect Angiolo Mazzoni, and is extended through the stations square. Messina Centrale station is at almost contiguous with Messina Marittima station, located by the port and constituting a rail/ferry interchange point to Villa San Giovanni station across the Strait of Messina.

The station is electrified and served by regional trains, by an experimental suburban railway to Giampilieri  and by the modern Messina tramway (at "Repubblica" stop, on station's square), opened in 2003. For long-distance transport it counts some InterCity and Express trains to Rome, Turin, Milan and Venice, linking it also with Genoa, Naples, Bologna, Florence, Pisa and other cities. It is also part of the projected Berlin–Palermo railway axis.

Photogallery

See also
Messina Marittima railway station
Strait of Messina Bridge
List of railway stations in Sicily
Railway stations in Italy
Rail transport in Italy
History of rail transport in Italy

Notes and references

External links

Railway stations in Sicily
Centrale Railway Station
Railway stations opened in 1866
1866 establishments in Italy
Railway stations in Italy opened in the 19th century